USS Jefferson City (SSN-759), a , is the only ship of the United States Navy to be named for Jefferson City, Missouri. The contract to build her was awarded to Newport News Shipbuilding and Dry Dock Company in Newport News, Virginia on 26 November 1984 and her keel was laid down on 21 September 1987.  She was launched on 17 August 1990 sponsored by Mrs. Susan A. Skelton, and commissioned on 29 February 1992, with Commander Russell Harris in command.

Jefferson City launched two Block III Tomahawks as part of a strike on Iraq on 3 September 1996.

Homeport is the Naval Station Pearl Harbor on the island of Oahu, Hawaii.

References 

Los Angeles-class submarines
Nuclear submarines of the United States Navy
1990 ships
Submarines of the United States
Ships built in Newport News, Virginia